Melati is an Malay-Indonesian name that is derived from Sanskrit may refer to the following notable people:

Given name
Melati Daeva Oktavianti (born 1994), Indonesian badminton player
Melati van Java (1853–1927), Indonesian-born Dutch writer
Melati Suryodarmo (born 1969), Indonesian durational performance artist
Melati Wijsen (born 2001), Indonesian climate activist

Surname
Nadya Melati (born 1986), Indonesian badminton player 
Rima Melati (born 1939), Indonesian actress and singer
Rima Melati Adams (born 1980), Singaporean model, actress, singer and TV personality